Francisco Alejandro Gutierrez (February 19, 1962 – October 22, 2005), known professionally as Franky Gee, was an American-German singer, rapper and soldier. He was the lead vocalist of the Europop group Captain Jack.

Early life
Gee was born in Havana, Cuba, with 3 siblings. His family emigrated to Miami, Florida, and he then went on to Mallorca, Spain when he was young. After college, he enlisted in the United States Army, and was stationed in Germany. While there, he began his career as a disc jockey. He grew tired of military service and decided to stay in Germany when his enlistment expired. In Darmstadt, Germany, he formed Captain Jack, alongside vocalist Liza da Costa, where he found success.

Gee also wrestled for Frontier Martial-Arts Wrestling in Japan on August 28, 2000 losing to Kodo Fuyuki at FMW's Super Dynamism 2000 pay-per-view.

Death
On October 17, 2005, he suffered a cerebral haemorrhage while walking with his son in Palma de Mallorca. He went into a coma and died five days later. The cerebral haemorrhage may have been due to a stroke in July 2002.

References

1962 births
2005 deaths
Cuban emigrants to the United States
Eurodance musicians
American expatriates in Germany
German dance musicians
United States Army soldiers
20th-century German male singers
English-language singers from Germany
German people of Cuban descent